A Customer integrated system (CIS) is an extension or hybrid of the transaction processing system (TPS) that places technology in the hands of the customer and allows them to process their own transactions. CIS represents a way of doing business at substantial savings; customers save time and organizations can lower their human resource costs.

Origin 

In 1992, Bergen Brunswig, a distributor of diversified drug and health care products, unintentionally created a CIS. According to the story, Bergen Brunswig decided to equip its sales representatives with a portable computer which included a multimedia product encyclopedia and customers' account information. The clients became increasingly interested in this system and in some cases even requested to borrow it from the sales representatives for their own use. As a result, the head of Research and Development at Bergen Brunswig, Jim McLaughlin, came up with the idea of modifying the system so that it included order-entry software and to provide this new system to the pharmacist free of charge.

Characteristics 

Characteristics include:

 Streamline organization's business processes
 Are at the very heart of every organization
 Are the new primary interface to customers
 Further decentralization of computing power in an organization by placing that power in the hands of the customers
 Empower the customers to process their own transactions anywhere at any time
 Can reduce waiting line time and therefore improve overall customer satisfaction
 Allow for an organization to cut costs by reducing human resources expenditures

Functions 

Functions include:

 Capturing information
 Creating information
 Cradling or storing information
 Communicating information
 Conveying information (secondary)

Examples 

A range of applications exist:

 Online shopping – browse or purchase a broad array of products anywhere any time
 ATMs and online banking – permits banking anywhere any time
 University and college online services – register for classes, make tuition payments and purchase books anywhere any time
 Vending machines – purchase anything from assorted snack foods to iPods

See also 

 Transaction processing system (TPS)
 Transaction processing
 Online transaction processing (OLTP)
 Online analytical processing (OLAP)
 Executive information systems (EIS)
 Artificial intelligence
 Neural network
 Workgroup support system (WSS)
 Groupware
 Spyware

References 

Transaction processing